Kapama Game Reserve (founded 1993) is a 13,000 hectare privately owned nature reserve in the Limpopo province of South Africa. It was founded by Johann Roode, who initially bought the land for cattle grazing but realized that the local ecosystem needed to be maintained. He soon started to develop the area as a touristic region and the reserve still belong nowadays to the Roode family.

Wildlife 

Fauna include:
 African bush elephant
 Cape buffalo
 Southern white rhinoceros 
 South African giraffe
 Impala
 Blue wildebeest 
 Kudu
 Lion
 Leopard
 Cheetah (including the King cheetah)
 Spotted hyena

See also 
 Protected areas of South Africa
 Kapama Private Game Reserve: http://www.kapama.com/about/
 Kapama Wildreservat:
 Moditlo Private Game Reserve

References 

Nature reserves in South Africa